Corsican Americans are Americans of Corsican descent.

Notable people

René Auberjonois
John Bernard
Charles J. Bonaparte
Cipriano Ferrandini
Tania Raymonde
Reni Santoni

References 

 
Corsican diaspora
French American
Italian American